The Diocese of Hanzhong/Nancheng  is a Latin Church ecclesiastical territory or diocese of the Catholic Church in China. The episcopal see is the city of Hanzhong (Shaanxi). The Diocese of Hanzhong is in the ecclesiastical province of the metropolitan Archdiocese of Xi'an.

History
 August 2, 1887: Established as the Apostolic Vicariate of Southern Shensi 陝西南境 from the Apostolic Vicariate of Shensi 陝西
 December 3, 1924: Renamed as Apostolic Vicariate of Hanzhongfu 漢中府
 April 11, 1946: Promoted as Diocese of Hanzhong 漢中

Leadership
 Vicars Apostolic of Southern Shensi 陝西南境
 Bishop Pio Giuseppe Passerini, P.I.M.E. (拔士林) (March 29, 1895 – April 24, 1918)
 Bishop Antonio Maria Capettini, P.I.M.E. (康) (April 2, 1919 – December 3, 1924)
 Vicars Apostolic of Hanzhongfu 漢中府
 Bishop Antonio Maria Capettini, P.I.M.E. (康) (December 3, 1924 – 1925)
 Bishop Lorenzo Maria Balconi, P.I.M.E. (巴) (later Archbishop) (March 7, 1928 – 1935)
 Bishop Mario Civelli, P.I.M.E. (祁济众) (March 11, 1935 – April 11, 1946)
 Bishops of Hanzhong 漢中
 Bishop Mario Civelli, P.I.M.E. (祁济众) (April 11, 1946 – February 2, 1966)
 Bishop Giuseppe Maggi, P.I.M.E. (孟守道) (January 13, 1949 – August 17, 1963)
 Bishop Bartholomew Yu Chengti (1984 - 2003)
 Bishop Matthias Yu Chengxin, coadjutor (December 1989 – 2007)
 Bishop Louis Yu Run-shen (1986–2019)
Bishop Stefano Xu Hongwei (2019-Present)

References

 GCatholic.org
 Catholic Hierarchy

Roman Catholic dioceses in China
Religious organizations established in 1887
Roman Catholic dioceses and prelatures established in the 19th century
1887 establishments in China
Christianity in Shaanxi
Hanzhong